Ashley Cooper defeated Neale Fraser in the final, 3–6, 6–3, 6–4, 13–11 to win the gentlemen's singles tennis title at the 1958 Wimbledon Championships. Cooper had to play 332 games to win the title, the most of any male champion in the history of the tournament. Lew Hoad was the defending champion, but was ineligible to compete after turning professional.

Seeds

  Ashley Cooper (champion)
  Mal Anderson (quarterfinals)
  Mervyn Rose (semifinals)
  Neale Fraser (final)
  Luis Ayala (third round)
  Kurt Nielsen (semifinals)
  Sven Davidson (quarterfinals)
  Barry MacKay (quarterfinals)

Draw

Finals

Top half

Section 1

Section 2

Section 3

Section 4

Bottom half

Section 5

Section 6

Section 7

Section 8

References

External links

Men's Singles
Wimbledon Championship by year – Men's singles